Joel Koshy Abraham (born 13 July 1989) is a New Zealand cricketer, who played for Canterbury in First class and List A cricket.

References 

New Zealand cricketers
Canterbury cricketers
1989 births
Living people